The 2010 Colorado State Rams football team represented Colorado State University in the 2010 NCAA Division I FBS football season. The team was coached by third year head coach Steve Fairchild and played their home games in Hughes Stadium in Fort Collins, Colorado. They played in the Mountain West Conference. On August 17, true freshman Pete Thomas was named the starting quarterback, making him the first freshman starter since Caleb Hanie in 2004. They finished the season with a record of 3–9 (1–7 MWC).

Schedule
The Rams played the following games:

References

Colorado State
Colorado State Rams football seasons
Colorado State Rams football